South Street in Philadelphia, originally named Cedar Street in William Penn's original street grid, is an east–west street forming the southern border of Center City and the northern border for South Philadelphia in Pennsylvania.  The South Street Headhouse District between Front Street and Seventh Street is a neighborhood known for its bohemian, punk, and alternative atmosphere and its diverse urban mix of shops, bars, and eateries. South Street is one of Philadelphia's largest and most prominent tourist attractions.

History

Originally the southern border of William Penn's 1682 city plan and officially named Cedar Street until 1854, eastern South Street had been originally the center of local Swedish and Dutch populations, then Irish in the early to mid 1800s, and, many decades later, Jewish and Italian immigrant culture as well as a vibrant African-American neighborhood. Because Quaker doctrine opposed live performances within the city limits, the first permanent theater in the United States was built on the south side of the street at Leithgow Street, giving birth to a tradition of Philadelphians seeking out entertainment on South Street that continues today. In 1854, the same year that South Street officially became South Street, the city boundaries were redrawn to expand the area of Philadelphia to 130 square miles. Despite no longer being a literal border, South Street remained a liminal space where cultures collided. The African-American theater district of western South Street, the Jewish shops, nearby Italian businesses, and visitors from other parts of the city combined to create a place described by William Gardner Smith in his 1954 book South Street as a lively zone of contact between many different ethnicities.

Until the 1950s, South Street was known mainly as a multiethnic garment district, with stores for men's suits and other clothing, while the more western areas around South Street served as a cultural and commercial center for South Philadelphia's African American community. Real estate values plummeted after city planner Edmund Bacon and others proposed the Crosstown Expressway, a short limited-access expressway connecting the Schuylkill Expressway and I-95 that would have required the demolition of many buildings on South Street and Bainbridge Street (an east–west street one block south of South Street). The suddenly cheap property attracted artists and counterculture-types. The proposed expressway was never built due to public opposition.

During this time, following the Crosstown Expressway proposal and the resulting drop in rent and property prices, South Street served as an artists' haven and a hub of Beat subculture and, later, 1960s counterculture, bohemianism, and the hippie movement in Philadelphia, establishing a lasting association of South Street with avant-garde and alternative subcultures. Starting mainly in the early 1960s to the 1970s, South Street was filled with clubs and bars that fostered a live local music community. It was not uncommon for South Philadelphians to "bar-hop" across the clubs, listening to live bands along the way. This community of fans helped attract recording contracts for many artists, including Kenn Kweder, the bard of South Street, George Thorogood, and Robert Hazard. From the mid to late 1970s into the 1980s, South Street's reputation as a musical, artistic, and countercultural hub was further solidified as it became the center of Philadelphia's punk scene and punk and alternative rock music communities, with venues such as JC Dobbs and stores such as Zipperhead catering to the burgeoning scene.

In the late 1980s, South Street became one of the city's main tourist attractions. Tourists flocked to the nightlife that South Street had accumulated over the years, and the "neighborhood" community aspect was gradually stripped from it. Many of the South Street clubs have closed, replaced by chain stores and shops to cater to tourists.

Today, the name South Street is popularly attached to an eight-block stretch of South extending after 8th Street (and a few adjacent streets).  It remains a popular hangout area for teens, college students, and twentysomethings with its assortment of bars, take-out eateries, sex shops, gift shops, and retailers catering to hip hop fashion, punk fashion, and/or urban culture.  A few restaurants and independent boutiques targeting a slightly more mature clientele are interspersed with these businesses, such as Accent on Animals, a pet supply store, and South Street Souvlaki, a Greek restaurant. In 1976, the famous cheesesteak restaurant Jim's Steaks of West Philadelphia expanded to South Street, becoming the restaurant's first franchise. The restaurant has since split from the original franchise and is now separately owned and renamed as Jim's South Street. Starting in the late 1990s, the street saw the establishment of various chain stores, including Johnny Rockets, two Starbucks locations, Häagen-Dazs, Rita's Italian Ice, Super Fresh, Whole Foods, CVS, and Fine Wine & Good Spirits.  South Street is adjacent to Headhouse Square, a notable plaza with various shops and restaurants.

Artist Isaiah Zagar has made South Street his home since the late 1960s and his mosaic work can be seen in multiple places along South Street including his large installation Philadelphia's Magic Gardens between 10th Street and 11th Street.

On June 4, 2022, three people were killed and eleven others were injured during the 2022 Philadelphia shooting.

Layout 

From west to east, South Street traverses the following neighborhoods:
 University City (West Philadelphia)
 Schuylkill
 Grays Ferry
 Fitler Square
 Rittenhouse Square
 Avenue of the Arts
 South Street Headhouse District
 Society Hill

South Street begins at 33rd and Spruce Streets in University City, heading east-southeast past the University of Pennsylvania's Franklin Field and the University Museum. It crosses the Schuylkill River on the South Street Bridge, a fixed bridge built in 2010 to replace a former double bascule bridge dating from 1923.  South Street then heads east (relative to the city grid), and becomes one-way eastbound from 27th Street all the way to Front Street.

South Street marks the 600 South block (from Market Street) in the city's gridiron street system. In West Philadelphia, the 600 South is delineated between 45th and 63rd Streets by Cedar Avenue, the name being a relic of the original name for South Street (Cedar Street) in the original plan for Philadelphia as drafted by William Penn. South Street and Cedar Avenue are discontinuous with each other due to Woodland Cemetery, the University of Pennsylvania (the former Blockley Township), and the Schuylkill River.

The historic district spans the following areas:

 South Street from Front to Broad.  Some sources also say that the neighborhood has begun to expand west from here since 2014.  Traditionally, the original neighborhood only existed from Front to 7th.  The limit as of 2017 is 11th Street
 Pine Street at 2nd (Head House Square)
 Lombard Street between Front and 3rd
 Kater Street
 4th Street down to Catherine Street (Fabric Row)
 Passyunk Avenue south to Fitzwater

The neighborhood significantly overlaps with Queen Village, Washington Square West, Bella Vista, and Society Hill.

Demographics 
In 2014, the area's population was 27,805. The average age for the neighborhood is 34.9, with 57.44% of the population between the ages of 18 to 44 and 62.3% of the population are renters with the average income of $71,856.

Public transportation 
South Street is traversed over its entire length by SEPTA's Route 40 bus, running eastbound on South and westbound on Lombard Street through Center City. During evenings and weekends, the 40 bus avoids the pedestrian congestion east of Broad Street by turning north on Broad and then turning east on Pine Street all the way to Front Street.  Several other transit routes cross South Street, most important being the subsurface Broad Street Line with its station at Lombard-South.

South Street in popular culture

The Orlons, a music group from Philadelphia, released a 1963 song based on (and titled) "South Street", which begins with the line "Where do all the hippies meet?"  Another Philadelphia-area band, The Dovells also mentioned South Street in their 1963 hit "You Can't Sit Down".
Philadelphia band Need New Body has a song called "So St RX", which is about South Street.
Fear's 1982 song "I Don't Care About You", which name-checks the neighborhoods associated with the punk movement in the United States in the early 1980s, begins with the line, "I'm from South Street Philadelphia" (also relevant to writer/vocalist Lee Ving who was born in the city).
The Dead Milkmen's 1988 song "Punk Rock Girl" makes references to Zipperhead (a punk rock/alternative clothing and accessories store) and The Philadelphia Pizza Company., Ltd, both of which were located on South Street. Portions of the video for this song were filmed on South Street. Zipperhead has since relocated to South 4th St. and been renamed to Crash Bang Boom. A few years after Zipperhead founder and building landlord Rick Millan sold the business to local musician Rob Windfelder and his business partner Stefanie Jollis, the store was relocated and renamed.
Green Day made their Philadelphia debut on January 23, 1993, at J.C. Dobbs on the 300 block of South Street. The band had not yet signed with Reprise and the club oversold the 125-capacity venue. Late arrivals paid to enter the second floor and watch the live video feed. During the third song of the set, a young woman had a seizure, the show was halted, and police ended the concert and cleared the venue.
Boyz II Men's debut song and video "Motownphilly" was partially filmed on South Street and the location is referenced in the song.
Singer songwriter Jake Laufer's 2009 rockabilly song, "Center City," about a guy from Tennessee coming north to meet up with his Philly-based girlfriend, features several South Street landmarks, including Lorenzo's Pizza and Famous 4th Street Deli.
The HBO comedy special The Diceman Cometh, starring comedian Andrew Dice Clay, was recorded at South Street's Theater of the Living Arts and was mentioned in the special by Clay.
The block of South Street between 5th and 6th Street is shown in the opening credits of the FX Network show It's Always Sunny in Philadelphia.
Philadelphia native Will Smith makes mention in his song "Gettin' Jiggy wit It" in the lyric "livin' that life some consider a myth, rock from South Street to one two fifth".

See also
 History of Philadelphia

References

External links

South Street Tourism Page

Center City, Philadelphia
Streets in Philadelphia